Manoj Varghese Parecattil is an Indian film director and writer, who works in Malayalam films. He made his directorial debut with Cuban Colony.

Biography
Manoj Varghese was born to Varghese on 1981 at Angamaly, in Eranakulam district, in Kerala.

Career 
He started his career as a director in an advertising production house. Manoj Varghese was an independent short film maker and an assistant director in Malayalam film Industry. Manoj got award for Best Director 2014 for short film 'FM – The Faceless Men' in First Cut Competition of Short films, Asianet Plus Channel.

Filmography 
Cuban Colony (2018)
FM – The Faceless Men (2014) (short film)

References

External links 
 
 

Malayalam film directors
1981 births
Living people